Wenck is a surname. Notable people with the surname include: 

Ewald Wenck (1891–1981), German actor
Friedrich August Wilhelm Wenck (1741–1810), German historian
Heinrich Wenck (1851–1936), Danish architect
Helfrich Bernhard Wenck (1739–1803), German historian
Walther Wenck (1900–1982), German army officer

See also
Wenk